Jérémie Elkaïm (born 29 August 1978) is a French actor, screenwriter and film director best known for his role in Presque rien (US title: Come Undone, 2000). In the film, he plays Mathieu, a troubled, emotionally fragile teen who finds himself in a whirlwind romance with Cédric (played by Stéphane Rideau). His performance in the film garnered him much critical acclaim.

Other notable films starring the actor include the comedy teen flick Sexy Boys (2001), which is touted to be the French version of American Pie, À cause d'un garçon (U.S. title: You'll Get Over It, 2002), where he plays yet another gay teenager, and Mariées mais pas trop in which he plays an insurance investigator. His latest role was the lead in the comedy film Les Bêtises.

He has also appeared in television, as 30-year-old Paul Delorme in the TV series Le Bureau (2006), the French version of The Office currently seen on Canal+. Paul often plays pranks on officemate Joël Liotard (Benoît Carré), and shows a level of attraction towards receptionist Laetitia Kadiri (Anne-Laure Balbir). His character is the French equivalent of the British version's Tim Canterbury (played by Martin Freeman) and the American version's Jim Halpert (played by John Krasinski).

Personal life
Elkaïm was born into a Moroccan Jewish family. He had a long-term relationship with actress/director Valérie Donzelli, with whom he still has a strong bond. They have two children together, and their story was the inspiration to Valérie's award-winning movie Declaration of War.

Since 2014, he has been in a relationship with his Marguerite & Julien co-star Anaïs Demoustier. They have a daughter who was born in March 2016.

Filmography

Television
2009: Douce France, directed by Stéphane Giusti
2008: Clara Sheller, Mathieu
2008: X Femmes, Season 1, Episode 1
2006: "Le Bureau" (mini), Paul Delorme
2004: La Nourrice, Mathieu
2002: Zone Reptile, Jacky

Films
2016: The Girl Without Hands, directed by Sébastien Laudenbach
2016: Irréprochable, directed by Sébastien Marnier
2015: Les Bêtises, directed by Rose and Alice Philippon
2015: Marguerite and Julien, directed by Valérie Donzelli
2011: Declaration of War, directed by Valérie Donzelli
2011: Belleville Tokyo, directed by Élise Girard
2011: Polisse, directed by Maïwenn
2010: La Reine des pommes, directed by Valérie Donzelli
2009: La Grande Vie, directed by Emmanuel Salinger
2007: Lisa et le pilote d'avion
2006:
L'Intouchable
Le Funambule
2003: Mariées mais pas trop, Thomas
2003: Qui a tué Bambi?, Ami de Sami
2002: À cause d'un garçon, Benjamin
2001:
Sexy Boys, Frank
Pornographe, Le
Petite sœur, Le jeune homme
La Gueule du loup
Folle de Rachid en transit sur Mars
2000:
Presque rien, Mathieu
Banqueroute, The dancer
Les Éléphants de la planète Mars
1999: Transit, Le chanteur
1998:
Scènes de lit, Paul in 'The Virgins'''Un léger différent''

References

External links

1978 births
Living people
People from Châtenay-Malabry
French male film actors
French people of Moroccan-Jewish descent
21st-century French Jews
French male television actors
French male screenwriters
French screenwriters
French film directors
20th-century French male actors
21st-century French male actors